Ultracopier is file-copying software for Windows, macOS, and Linux. It supersedes SuperCopier.

Features 
Main features include:
pause/resume transfers
dynamic speed limitation
on-error resume
error/collision management
data security
intelligent reorganization of transfer to optimize performance
 plugins

Normal vs Ultimate version:

The code sources are exactly the same, and under the same licence
The basic ultimate version just include some alternate plugin
All versions are without DRM (this is explicitly banned by the GPLv3 license) and can be redistributed freely.

The difference between SuperCopier and Ultracopier is the skin, Supercopier is just a skin for Ultracopier in CSS (then use little bit more cpu). But talk about SuperCopier implies you refer to the v3 or less, while talk about Ultracopier implies you refer to SuperCopier v4 and later, which has been renamed as Ultracopier v1.4.

See also 

List of file copying software
FastCopy
GS RichCopy 360

References

External links
 
 https://alternativeto.net/software/ultracopier/
 https://www.softpedia.com/reviews/windows/Ultracopier-Review-162037.shtml
 http://www.ohloh.net/p/ultracopier
 https://mac.softpedia.com/get/Utilities/Ultracopier.shtml
 https://doc.ubuntu-fr.org/ultracopier
 https://salsa.debian.org/debian/ultracopier.git

2010 software
File copy utilities
Cross-platform free software
Free multilingual software
Free utility software
Utilities for macOS
Software that uses Qt